Mohammad Ali Moni is a Bangladeshi computer engineer, researcher and data analyst. He has done research in various institutions including University of New South Wales, Cancer Research UK Cambridge Institute and so on. He is research fellow in the Cancer Research Network of Faculty of Medicine in Sydney University and bone division of Garvan Institute of Medical Research.

Early life and education 
Moni is born in Pabna District. He passed SSC from Pabna Zilla School in 1998. Then He got admitted into Computer Science and Engineering Department at Islamic University, Bangladesh in Kushtia. He did his PhD in clinical bioinformatics from the University of Cambridge.

Career 
 Research Fellow at University of Sydney (2017-12-08 to 2020-02-07)
 Research Fellow (Faculty of Medicine) at University of New South Wales (2015-02-02 to present)
 School of Public Health & Community Medicine at University of New South Wales (2020-02-10 to present)

Works 
He published more than 200 articles and book chapters. His research interest is Cancer and bone genetics, disease comorbidities, diseasome, co-infection and cancer, data science, AI and machine learning.

References

External links 
 Dr Mohammad Ali Moni at Google Scholar
 Mohammad Ali Moni at ResearchGate

Alumni of the University of Cambridge
Islamic University, Bangladesh alumni
Bangladeshi computer scientists
Year of birth missing (living people)
Living people
People from Pabna District